Gloucester Pool is a lake in Georgian Bay Township, District of Muskoka, Ontario, Canada.  It is approximately 5 kms northeast of the town of Port Severn.

See also
List of lakes in Ontario

Lakes of the District Municipality of Muskoka